Sarkar is a surname among the people of the Indian subcontinent.
It was an honorific title given to landlords/zamindars of East India, irrespective of their religious affiliation, under the Mughal Empire and even in Sher Shah's reign, as part of the erstwhile Persian nobility. 
At present there are Sarkar families in different parts of West Bengal, India as well as in Bangladesh. The term is used in both Bengali Hindu and Muslim communities.

The Persian connotation of the word refers to 'chieftain', 'lord', or 'superintendent'.  In modern Bengali and Hindi, however, Sarkar refers to government/governance.

The developed form of the word Sharkar is Sarkar and the developed form of the same Sarkar word is Sargar or "Sargara" in Rajasthani dialect.

Geographical distribution
As of 2014, 79.0% of all known bearers of the surname Sarkar were residents of West Bengal, India and 19.8% were residents of Bangladesh. In India, the frequency of the surname was higher than national average in the following states and union territories:
 1. Tripura (1:29)
 2. West Bengal (1:55)
 3. Andaman and Nicobar Islands (1:99)
 4. Assam (1:207)

Notable people
Notable people with the family name of Sarkar include:

Academics

 Benoy Kumar Sarkar (1887–1949), Indian social scientist, professor, and nationalist
 Jadunath Sarkar (1870–1958), Indian aristocrat and historian
 Lotika Sarkar (1923–2013), Indian feminist, social worker, educator and lawyer
 Mahendralal Sarkar (1833–1904), Indian doctor, social reformer, and propagator of scientific studies
 Maqbular Rahman Sarkar (1928–1985), Bangladeshi academic and tenth vice-chancellor of Rajshahi University
 Palash Sarkar (born 1969), Indian mathematician and academic
 Peary Charan Sarkar (1823–1875), Indian educationist and textbook writer
 Prabhat Ranjan Sarkar (1921–1990), Indian social and spiritual philosopher
 Sahotra Sarkar (born 1962), Bengali-American philosopher of science and conservation biologist
 Sameer P. Sarkar, British psychiatrist
 Satyabrata Sarkar (born 1928) Indian biologist
 Soumodip Sarkar (born 1965), Indian economist and management researcher
 Sucharit Sarkar (born 1983), Indian mathematician
 Sumit Sarkar (born 1939), Indian historian
 Susobhan Sarkar (1900–1982), Indian historian and academic
 Tanika Sarkar, Indian historian
 Sisir Kumar Sarkar, Indian scientist
 Tapan Sarkar (1948–2021), Indian-American electrical engineer

Literature
 Akshay Chandra Sarkar (1846–1917), Indian poet, editor and literary critic
 Arunabh Sarkar (born 1941), Bangladeshi poet, and literary Editor
 Jatin Sarker (born 1938), Bengali writer
 Subodh Sarkar(born 1958), Bengali poet

Politicians
 Ajit Sarkar (1947–1998), Indian politician, member of Communist Party of India (Marxist)
 Amal Kumar Sarkar (fl. 1901–1966), Chief Justice of India
 Dilip Sarkar (Tripura politician)
 Hemanta Kumar Sarkar (1896–1952), Indian writer, linguist and politician
 Jagannath Sarkar (1919–2011), Indian Communist leader, freedom fighter, and writer
 Manik Sarkar (born 1949), Chief Minister of Tripura from 1998 to 2018
 Matilal Sarkar (born 1941), Indian politician from the Communist Party of India (Marxist)
 Muhammad Jamiruddin Sarkar (born 1931), Bangladeshi barrister and politician
 Nalini Ranjan Sarkar (1882–1953), Indian businessman, industrialist and politician

Sportspeople

Footballers
 Anupam Sarkar (born 1985), Indian footballer from West Bengal
 Gautam Sarkar (born 1950), Indian footballer
 Krishna Rani Sarkar (born 2001), Bangladeshi footballer
 Tirthankar Sarkar (born 1993), Indian footballer

Cricketers
 Soumya Sarkar (born 1993), Bangladeshi cricketer
 Sourav Sarkar (born 1984), Indian cricketer
 Hannan Sarkar (born 1982), Bangladeshi test cricketer
 Uttam Sarkar (born 1986), Bangladeshi cricketer
 Satya Sarkar, Indian cricketer from Assam
 Beas Sarkar (born 1979), Indian cricketer

Journalists
 Ash Sarkar (born 1992), British journalist and political activist
 Ashok Kumar Sarkar (1912–1983), eighth editor-in-chief and owner of Anandabazar Patrika and the ABP Group
 Aveek Sarkar, Indian newspaper owner, editor-in-chief of Anandabazar Patrika and The Telegraph

Entertainers
 Badal Sarkar (1925–2011), Indian dramatist and theatre director
 Bijoy Sarkar (1903–1985), Baul singer, lyricist and composer
 Joy Sarkar, Indian music director and songwriter
 Laboni Sarkar (born 1962), Bengali film and television actress
 Payel Sarkar (born 1985), Indian film and television actress
 Pradeep Sarkar (born 1955), writer and director
 Priyanka Sarkar (born 1990), Bengali film and television actress
 Sohini Sarkar (born 1986), film and television actress

Gurus
 Prabhat Ranjan Sarkar, Indian Guru of Ananda Marga

See also

 Sarkar (disambiguation)
 Sircar
 Sorcar

References

Surnames of Indian origin

fr:Sarkar (homonymie)